25H-NBOMe (NBOMe-2C-H) is a derivative of the phenethylamine hallucinogen 2C-H, which acts as a highly potent partial agonist for the human 5-HT2A receptor.

Legality

Sweden
The Riksdag added 25H-NBOMe to Narcotic Drugs Punishments Act under swedish schedule I ("substances, plant materials and fungi which normally do not have medical use") as of August 1, 2013, published by Medical Products Agency (MPA) in regulation LVFS 2013:15 listed as 25H-NBOMe, and 2-(2,5-dimetoxifenyl)-N-(2-metoxibensyl)etanamin.

United Kingdom

See also 
 2CBCB-NBOMe (NBOMe-TCB-2)
 2CBFly-NBOMe (NBOMe-2CB-Fly)
 2C-C-NBOMe (NBOMe-2CC)
 25B-NBOMe (NBOMe-2CB)
 25I-NBOMe (NBOMe-2CI)
 25I-NBMD (NBMD-2CI)
 25B-NBOH
 25I-NBOH (NBOH-2CI)

References 

25-NB (psychedelics)
Designer drugs